The German Village Commission is a governmental organization appointed by the Mayor of Columbus, Ohio to "preserve, protect and enhance the unique architectural and historical features of the German Village Historic District." The commission has the power to approve architectural designs and exterior alterations. The commission was formed in 1960 pursuant to ordinances #976-60 and #1221-60.

References

Organizations based in Columbus, Ohio
Government of Columbus, Ohio
German Village